Samu Nieminen (born 14 January 1992) is a Finnish footballer who most recently played for Finnish club JJK. He plays as a central defender.

Nieminen started playing football at the age of seven in Huhtasuon Kisa. He moved to JJK in 2006. Nieminen signed a first team contract with the JJK in 2009 and made his Veikkausliiga debut on 9 May 2010 against MyPa. In 2012 Nieminen made a breakthrough and was 20 times in starting lineup. He continued as a starting lineup player in next season but the season was disappointment when JJK was last in league. In 2014 Nieminen signed a contract with FK Kruoja and won the silver medal. In 2015 Nieminen signed a two-year contract with Ilves.

On 15 August 2016, je returned to JJK on loan for the remainder of the 2016 season.

International career

Nieminen has played four matches in Finland U21 and 42 matches in Finland junior national teams. Nieminen has been a captain of Finland junior national teams.

References

External links
  Profile at fcjjk.com

1992 births
Living people
Finnish footballers
JJK Jyväskylä players
Veikkausliiga players
Association football central defenders
Sportspeople from Jyväskylä
21st-century Finnish people